The OM System OM-1 is the flagship mirrorless interchangeable-lens camera produced by OM Digital Solutions on the micro four-thirds system. It is the first high-end digital camera made by OM Digital Solutions after its acquisition of the imaging divisions of the camera manufacturer Olympus. The OM-1 was announced on February 15, 2022, and began shipping to customers the following month.  Despite no longer being a product of Olympus, the OM-1 still bears the Olympus wordmark on the front of its electronic viewfinder, tying the camera to Olympus' flagship E-M1 cameras. The camera's name is the same as the Olympus OM-1, the first OM film SLR camera, and was released to coincide with that camera's 50th anniversary.

References

External links 

 

OM-01
Cameras introduced in 2022